There are two flags in official use in the Serbian Autonomous Province of Vojvodina, the Flag of Vojvodina and the Traditional flag of Vojvodina. Two flags are given the equal status in the 
Provincial Assembly Decision on the Appearance and Usage of Symbols and Traditional Symbols of AP Vojvodina adopted in 2016.

Both the Flag and the Traditional flag of Vojvodina are based on the Serb tricolour. It consists of three horizontal strands of red, blue and white, with the blue portion being significantly wider in the Flag and all three strands being of the same width in the Traditional flag. The blue portion of the Flag of Vojvodina contains three yellow stars representing the three geographic regions of Vojvodina: Bačka, Banat and Srem. The flag of Vojvodina was adopted on 27 February 2004. The Traditional flag of Vojvodina has two variants, with and without the Traditional coat of arms of Vojvodina in the middle. Both variants have equal status. The Traditional flag was adopted on 15 September 2016.

History

Historical flag of Serbian Vojvodina
According to the Constitution of Serbian Vojvodina, the flag was a Serbian tricolour (red-blue-white).
The flag of the Serbian Vojvodina was introduced in 1848, and featured a coat-of-arms which was essentially the Austrian Habsburg imperial arms, with the coat-of-arms of the Serbs (Serbian cross) on the chest of the black eagle. The bearer of the Serbian arms was the Austrian black eagle, instead of the Serbian white one, in order to show the fidelity of the newly established Voivodship to the Imperial Court in Vienna. The coat-of-arms was added to the yellow-black background. Thus the flag differed from the flag of the Principality of Serbia, which used Serbian national tricolour and had a different arms in the middle of its state flag.

On March 17, 2015, the Assembly of Vojvodina failed to meet two-thirds of votes on the legislation of parallel use of the historical coat of arms and flag from 1848.

1990s proposed unofficial flag
The blue-yellow-green flag (vertical and horizontal) was used as an unofficial flag of Vojvodina by some regionalist political parties such as League of Social Democrats of Vojvodina, Vojvodina Coalition, etc. This flag was introduced during the 1990s (at the time when Vojvodina did not have its official flag) with the proposal that it should become the future flag of Vojvodina. Since the adoption of the official Vojvodina flag in 2004, the proposed flag has mostly been abandoned as an unofficial symbol of the province, and is today only sporadically used as the LSV party flag. The proposed 1990s flag is based on the similar flag that dates back to 11 May 1848, when it was adopted as the flag of the Serb revolutionaries from Šajkaška (central part of Vojvodina, east of Novi Sad). More precisely, that flag was used by the Šajkaš Battalion that belonged to the Germanic-Illyric Regiment of the Banatian Military Frontier. However, the original flag had a brownish colour instead of green. There are horizontal variants of the flag as well.

Those who proposed the flag during the 1990s contended that blue, yellow and green colours representing the sky, corn and grazing land (pasture), respectively. Another interpretation is that those colours representing the sky, sun and fertile land of Vojvodina, respectively.

During the 1990s, this flag was one of the symbols of Vojvodinian regionalist movement that was opposing Milošević's regime in Belgrade. Today this flag is used as a party flag of the League of Social Democrats of Vojvodina, which advocated that Vojvodina should become a constituent republic of the new regionalised and federalised Serbia. However, even this party now uses the official flag of Vojvodina, as a symbol of the region.

See also
Coat of arms of Vojvodina
Flag of Serbia
List of Serbian flags

References

Further reading
"Leksiklopedija" (column), TV Novosti magazine, Belgrade, 1991.

Vojvodina
Culture of Vojvodina
Vojvodina